Chetone hydra is a moth of the family Erebidae. It was described by Arthur Gardiner Butler in 1871. It is found in Ecuador and Peru.

References

Chetone
Moths described in 1871